Zurabi Guramovich Gedekhauri (born 30 July 1994) is a Georgian-born Russian Greco-Roman wrestler. He won a bronze medal in the 130 kg event at the 2021 European Wrestling Championships.  He also won a silver medal at the 2016 Wrestling World Cup and 2018 World University Wrestling Championships. In addition, he finished second at the Russian Championships in 2020 and third in 2018, 2019 and 2021.

Early life
Gedekhauri was born on 30 July 1994 in Tbilisi, Georgia. He is the son of Greco-Roman wrestler Guram Gedekhauri.

References

External links 
 

1994 births
Living people
Sportspeople from Tbilisi
Georgian emigrants to Russia
Russian people of Georgian descent
Male sport wrestlers from Georgia (country)
Russian male sport wrestlers
World Wrestling Championships medalists